The Time Thief is a 2021 Canadian period drama and fantasy film directed by Francis Leclerc, based on the 2009 story by Fred Pellerin of the same name. It stars Jade Charbonneau, Marc Messier, Céline Bonnier, Guillaume Cyr, Émile Proulx-Cloutier, Marie-Ève Beauregard, Pier-Luc Funk, Sonia Cordeau, and Geneviève Schmidt. The film was theatrically released by Les Films Séville on November 19, 2021.

Premise
An illness-worn grandmother tries to convince her 11-year-old grandson that death does not exist. She tells him about the adventures of her youth in Saint-Élie-de-Caxton, in 1927, when she had tried to eliminate death in the village.

Cast
 Jade Charbonneau as a young Bernadette
 Michèle Deslauriers as an older Bernadette
 Marc Messier as Méo, a barber
 Céline Bonnier as La Stroop
 Guillaume Cyr as Riopel, a blacksmith, and father of Lurette
 Émile Proulx-Cloutier as Toussaint Brodeur, a merchant and Jeannette's husband
 Marie-Ève Beauregard as Lurette, Riopel's daughter
 Pier-Luc Funk
 Sonia Cordeau as Jeannette, Brodeur's wife
 Geneviève Schmidt as Madame Gélinas

Production

Development

Fred Pellerin wrote the story L'Arracheuse de temps in 2007 shortly after the death of his father. On March 30, 2016, it was announced that a feature film adaptation of the story had been in the works from the production company Attraction Images. While working on the 2017 film Barefoot at Dawn with director Francis Leclerc, Pellerin wrote part of the initial screenplay for the film. On January 18, 2019, Leclerc revealed that he would direct the film, from a now-completed screenplay written by Pellerin. On April 8, 2019, the film's screenplay was submitted to SODEC, who announced on December 16, 2019, that they would be funding the film.

Filming
Filming for The Time Thief was divided into two filming blocks; the first began on October 13, 2020, in Saint-Armand, in the Eastern Townships of Quebec. Filming for the first block, which was mainly focused on shooting exterior scenes, continued in areas around the municipality of Montérégie, and concluded on October 30, 2020. Because of the COVID-19 pandemic, Fred Pellerin was not allowed to visit the film's set until October 15, 2020. The second filming block took place in April 2021 in areas around Montreal, with the intentions of shooting the film's interior scenes in a studio.

Release
The Time Thief was theatrically released by Les Films Séville in the Canadian province of Quebec on November 19, 2021.

Accolades

References

External links
 

2021 films
2021 drama films
2021 fantasy films
2020s historical drama films
Canadian historical drama films
Films directed by Francis Leclerc
French-language Canadian films
2020s Canadian films